Clinton County is a county located in the U.S. state of Kentucky in the Pennyrile Region along the southern border with Tennessee. As of the 2020 census, the population was 9,253. Its county seat is Albany. The county was formed in 1835 and named for DeWitt Clinton, the seventh Governor of New York. It is a prohibition or dry county.

History
Clinton County was formed on February 20, 1835, from portions of Cumberland and Wayne counties. It was named for  DeWitt Clinton, governor of New York and driving force behind the Erie Canal.

Courthouse fires in 1864 (Civil War guerrillas) and 1980 resulted in the destruction of county records, but in the latter case, local volunteers' assistance successfully preserved almost all records.

Geography

Adjacent counties
 Russell County (north)
 Wayne County (east/EST border)
 Pickett County, Tennessee (south)
 Clay County, Tennessee (southwest)
 Cumberland County (west)

Demographics

As of the census of 2000, there were 9,634 people, 4,086 households, and 2,811 families residing in the county. The racial makeup of the county was 99.09% White, 0.10% Black or African American, 0.25% Native American, 0.04% Asian, 0.11% Pacific Islander, 0.08% from other races, and 0.32% from two or more races.  1.22% of the population were Hispanic or Latino of any race.

There were 4,086 households, out of which 29.80% had children under the age of 18 living with them, 55.50% were married couples living together, 9.70% had a female householder with no husband present, and 31.20% were non-families. 28.40% of all households were made up of individuals, and 12.80% had someone living alone who was 65 years of age or older.  The average household size was 2.34 and the average family size was 2.85.

In the county, the population was spread out, with 22.70% under the age of 18, 8.60% from 18 to 24, 27.70% from 25 to 44, 26.00% from 45 to 64, and 15.00% who were 65 years of age or older.  The median age was 39 years. For every 100 females there were 92.90 males.  For every 100 females age 18 and over, there were 91.50 males.

The median income for a household in the county was $19,563, and the median income for a family was $25,919. Males had a median income of $21,193 versus $16,194 for females. The per capita income for the county was $13,286.  About 20.20% of families and 25.80% of the population were below the poverty line, including 31.80% of those under age 18 and 29.90% of those age 65 or over.

Communities

 Aaron
 Abstons Corner
 Albany (county seat)
 Alpha
 Browns Crossroads
 Bug
 Cannons Mill
 Cartwright
 Cedar Knob
 Churntop
 Cumberland City
 Decide
 Dicken
 Five Springs
 Highway
 Hobart
 Hogback
 Huntersville
 Ida
 Jones Mill
 Lettered Oak
 Marlow
 Narvel
 Nora
 Pikeview
 Rolan
 Savage
 Seventy Six
 Shipley
 Snow
 Sparta
 Static‡
 Upchurch
 Wago
 Watauga
 Willis Creek
 Wolf River Dock

Politics
In presidential elections Clinton County has been overwhelmingly Republican ever since Reconstruction ended. Its Republican sympathies are reflected by the fact that, relative to population, Clinton County was a leader in providing soldiers for the Union Army, seeing 12.54% of its white population volunteer for Union service, exceeded only by the now-similarly Republican Owsley, Estill and Clay counties.

The last Democrat to carry Clinton County was Horatio Seymour in 1868 – when party realignment was just beginning – and the last Democrat to pass so much as 30 percent of the county's vote was Grover Cleveland in 1888. Nor has any Republican in this time span – even William Howard Taft during the divided 1912 election – fallen short of 60 percent. Jackson County is the only other county in the United States that has seen no Democrat reach 30 percent since the beginning of the 1890s, and apart from these two only Hooker County, Nebraska has seen no Democrat reach 30 percent since 1940.

See also

 Garlin Murl Conner
 Champ Ferguson
 Preston Leslie
 Dry counties
 National Register of Historic Places listings in Clinton County, Kentucky

References

 
1835 establishments in Kentucky
Populated places established in 1835
Kentucky counties
Counties of Appalachia